Katherine Schmidt (February 6, 1899 – April 18, 1978) was an American artist and art activist. Early in her career the figure studies, landscapes, and still lifes she painted drew praise for their "purity and clarity of color," "sound draftsmanship," and "individual choice of subject and its handling." During the 1930s she was known mainly for the quality of her still life paintings which showed, one critic said, "impeccable artistry." At the end of her career, in the 1960s and 1970s, she produced specialized and highly disciplined still lifes of objects such as dead leaves and pieces of crumpled paper, which, said a critic, approached a "magical realism." As an art activist she helped promote the rights of artists for fair remuneration.

Art training

In 1912, at the age of 13, Schmidt began to take Saturday classes at the Art Students League under the artist Agnes Richmond. At that time the League was popular with girls and young women who wished to study art and its Saturday classes made it accessible to those, like Schmidt, who were attending school on weekdays. While still in high school she, her sister, and two other girls spent part of one summer painting at the art colony in Woodstock, New York. With her sister and another girl she spent the next two summer vacations painting in Gloucester, Massachusetts, then a popular destination for artists. During these trips Agnes Richmond acted as chaperon and guardian.

In 1917 after graduating from high school Schmidt took regular afternoon classes at the League. By chance she joined the class of Kenneth Hayes Miller, the artist who would most influence her mature style. Schmidt found Miller's teaching style to be emotionally and intellectually demanding. She said that in addition to teaching technique Miller helped each student bring out his or her unique talents and as a result, she said, "all of us were enormously different" in manner of working and artistic style. By giving them group assignments and inviting them to regular Wednesday afternoon teas at his apartment Miller also helped his students become well acquainted with one another.

During the time she was his student the League abolished its same-sex classroom policy and, mixing more freely with men than she had previously been able to do, Schmidt broadened her circle of friends. To a group of women she had previously befriended she now added a roughly equal number of men. Over the next few decades this group of students would form the nucleus of three others: (1) the "Fourteenth Street school" or "Miller gang" made up of Miller students who rented apartments in the vicinity of his apartment at 30 E. 14th Street, (2) the "Whitney Circle" all of whom were members of the Whitney Studio Club, and (3) the artists attached to two galleries, the Daniel Gallery and, after its demise, the Downtown Gallery. In 1932 Peggy Bacon produced a drypoint print showing the group enjoying themselves at a Third Avenue bowling alley. Entitled "Ardent Bowlers," it showed Alexander Brook, Yasuo Kuniyoshi, Reginald Marsh, along with Peggy herself and others of Schmidt's friends. In an oral history interview of 1969 Schmidt named many of the ardent bowlers as her lifelong friends.

Artistic career

Schmidt became founding member of Whitney Studio Club in 1918. The club welcomed talented young artists such as Schmidt and her friends from the Miller class. Proponents of all artistic styles were welcome and the membership grew quickly as members proposed other artists for membership. In addition to holding group shows, the club held solo exhibitions in separate galleries for two or three members at a time. These exhibitions drew favorable reviews from New York critics thus helping Schmidt and the club's other young members, especially the women among them, to advance their careers. Schmidt later recalled that the young League students in the club were among the first League artists of her time to be given exhibitions.

In 1919 Schmidt married fellow student Yasuo Kuniyoshi at an artist compound that had been established by Hamilton Easter Field in Ogunquit, Maine. As a patron of young artists, Field had recognized Kuniyoshi's talent and had invited him to spend summers in Ogunquit beginning in 1918. Schmidt met Field through Kuniyoshi and was herself invited to attend. As a wedding present Field gave them the use of a studio in the compound and also gave them an apartment in one of two houses he owned in Brooklyn's Columbia Heights.

1920s

Although both Schmidt and Kuniyoshi were able to sell a few paintings in the early 1920s, they had to take jobs both to support themselves and to save for a planned trip to Europe. Schmidt ran the lunch room at the League during this time and later ran an evening sketch class and performed odd jobs for the Whitney Studio Club.

Schmidt and Kuniyoshi spent two years in Europe during 1925 and 1926 and returned there in 1927. Unlike Kuniyoshi and other American artists who traveled in France, Spain, and Italy during the 1920s, Schmidt did not find in those places subjects that she wished to paint and she returned to the United States feeling that the American environment suited her artistic outlook better than the European.

The Whitney Studio Club had given Schmidt her first solo exhibition in 1923. She and two other artists showed works in three separate galleries. In 1927 Schmidt was given her second solo show, the first of an annual series of them held at the Daniel Gallery. By this time Schmidt's work had become familiar to both critics and gallery goers. Earlier shows at the Whitney Studio Club, the Society of Independent Artists, and a few other galleries had attracted notice from New York art critics, but these reviews were not nearly as comprehensive as the write ups her work received at this time. A critic for the Brooklyn Daily Eagle, Helen Appleton Read, said her work during the early years of her career had showed Kenneth Hayes Miller's influence but was nonetheless "distinctly personal." The paintings in the solo show at the Daniel Gallery were now, she said, less given to Miller-like subjects than they had been. A critic for the New York Times noted an influence of Renoir in the figure studies and praised her ability to capture a sense of drama in her subjects but felt, overall, that her work lacked feeling, was "somewhat dry in aspect."

In reviewing the solo show given her a year later a Brooklyn Daily Eagle critic noticed a continuing improvement in her work. This critic saw little influence of Miller's naïve style, a continuing feeling for texture and color, and, in general, and increasing competency in her work. Writing about the same show Margaret Bruening of the New York Evening Post mentioned lingering traces of "Kenneth Hayes Millerism," praised Schmidt's self-portrait as "a likeness and a good piece of plastic design carried out in reticence and surety," and said that she "seems to grow quite steadily and triumphantly into her own." One painting, called "Still Life" was to Breuning the highlight of the exhibition. "A real joy to behold," it was, she said, a work of "power and beauty" having "aesthetic emotion" that was lacking in Schmidt's landscapes and figure paintings. The tendency to see increasing strength and maturity in Schmidt's work continued in reviews of her solo show at the Daniel Gallery in 1930 of which one critic pointed to a "a rich and natural realization of her gifts" and said "she is now reaping the artistic reward for this strenuous apprenticeship, in a power and concentration that the more easily satisfied painter does not attain."

1930s

Schmidt held her last solo show at the Daniel Gallery in 1931. By then she was seen as primarily a still life painter. One critic found the still lifes in the show to be technically sound but lacking in "soul." Finding in them a "substantial fund of humor," another said they showed an "uncanny skill in surrounding three-dimensional forms with air" and possessed a "mysterious realism." A third critic, Breuning in the Evening Post, saw in them an "astonishing vitality." In 1932 the new Whitney Museum of American Art showed one of Schmidt's paintings in a group exhibition and the following year the museum purchased it.

Schmidt began showing at the Downtown Gallery in 1933, following the closure of the Daniel Gallery the year before. Of her first solo show at the Downtown Gallery in 1934, Edward Alden Jewell of the New York Times said she showed a lingering influence of both Miller and Renoir in some figure studies but added "it never does to pigeonhole Katherine Schmidt's art with too much easy confidence." He called her painting, "Tiger, Tiger," humorous, exotic, and, in all, the best work she had done in a long time. Noting her skillful handling of portraits, figure studies, landscapes, and still lifes,  he added, "Katherine Schmidt may well be styled the Ruth Draper of the art world." Writing that "she has by no means attained the position as one of the foremost painters of the younger generation that she deserves," a critic for the Brooklyn Daily Eagle called this show "one of the outstanding exhibitions of the year." Schmidt continued to receive thoughtful reviews of both solo and group shows held at the Downtown Gallery, the Whitney Museum, and other venues in the middle and late 1930s.

Fellow artist, friend, art historian, curator, and critic, Lloyd Goodrich said that Schmidt's technical command increased during the early 1930s and this command was most apparent in her still life work: "Every object was modeled with a complete roundness and a sensation of solidity and weight... The relations of each element to the others, and to the space in which they were contained, were clearly understood. The result was finely conceived, closely knit design. Color was full-bodied, earthy, neither sweet nor brilliant." At this time she began to make figure studies of the Depression's victims and for portraying these subjects Edward Alden Jewell wrote that she was "the right artist for the right task." Describing the paintings in a 1939 solo show at the Downtown as "delightfully congruous," he said they revealed "a charming, subtle style that has ripened and that has real stature." Goodrich described one of these figure studies, "Broe and McDonald Listen In," as different from "the idealized pictures of the proletariat common at the time" and said "every element" of the painting "played its part as form, even Broe's shirtsleeves, whose folds were as consciously designed as the draperies in old masters."

1940s, 1950s, and 1960s

After 1939 Schmidt produced less work and although she appeared in group shows she gave no further solo exhibitions until 1961. During the war years she produced an atypical painting, "Home," evoking patriotic sentiments. Noting that it was a marked departure from the aesthetic distance she had previously maintained, a critic called this work "almost religious."

Toward the end of the 1930s Schmidt had begun to feel dissatisfied with her work in general and particularly with her technique. To solve the problem she returned to fundamentals. Using a German text that her husband translated for her, she slowly rebuilt her skills over the next two decades. The book was Max Doerner's Malmaterial und seine Verwendung im Bilde. She said: "The reading of the Doerner book was very important personally to me. It took me years to understand the technique really, I mean the meaning of it." Doerner called for a disciplined approach to painting. Deploring what he saw as a modern tendency for artists to use a "free and easy technique untrammeled by any regard for the laws of the materials," he called for "systematically constructed pictures" produced by "clearly thought-out pictorial projects, where every phase of the picture is developed almost according to a schedule." In 1960 she found a new focus for her art. Capitalizing on the strength she had previously shown in still lifes and employing the disciplines she learned from Doerner, she began to use a naturalistic approach which, as one critic said, approached a "magical realism."

Her decision to work in a new style was sudden. She said: "One day I washed my hands. My waste basket wasn't right there so I threw the paper towel down on the table. Later when I went back into this little room I had in the country, there was this piece of paper lying there. I thought, "Oh, my, that's beautiful." And I painted it." Her new work was precise and realistic almost to the point of trompe-l'œil. Her subjects were ordinary objects of no obvious beauty, crumpled paper and dead leaves. Using what one critic called a "neat and painstaking draftsmanship," she made pictures which one critic found to contain "an almost pre-Raphaelite intensity." Her method was slow and methodical. She built up each painting systematically over as many as five months. As a result, it took her a long time to accumulate enough new work for a gallery exhibition. She had used objects such as these in some of her earlier still lifes but never as the main element of a painting. Lloyd Goodrich said that in paintings like "Blue Paper and Cracker Boxes" Schmidt was able to give "movement and life" to the "unsubstantial, immobile" objects she painted and concluded that her paintings at this time "within their severely limited content, achieved the purest artistry of all her works."

Schmidt respected and admired the work of abstract and non-objective artists, but she never felt inclined to work in that style. In 1969 she said I never have liked to work from my imagination. I like to work from a fact, and I will try to make something out of the fact. I enjoy that most. And I do my best work when I do that. I don't know whether it's just because I put it out of my mind that I don't like to make things up. Some artists are marvelous at just fantastic inventions. But I love the smell and the feel of life. You have to follow your appetites. You don't choose to be what you are. You are what you are.

During the 1960s and 1970s Schmidt showed at the Isaacson, Zabriskie, and Durlacher Galleries, in exhibitions that appeared, as she said, pretty much as she pleased. During the 1970s her output diminished up to her death in 1978.

Exhibitions

Schmidt's work appeared most frequently in group and solo shows held in the early 1920s by the Whitney Studio Club, in the later 1920s by the Daniel Gallery, in the 1930s by the Downtown Gallery and the Whitney Museum of American Art, and in the 1960s and 1970s by the Isaacson and Durlacher Galleries. In addition to these shows, Schmidt's work appeared in group exhibitions at A.W.A. Clubhouse, An American Group, Inc., Art Students League, Associated American Artists, Brooklyn Society of Modern Artists, Carnegie Institute, Pittsburgh, Penn., Corcoran Gallery, Washington, D.C., Grand Central Galleries, J. Wanamaker Gallery of Modern Decorative Art, New York World's Fair, 1939, Newark Museum, Newark, N.J., Pennsylvania Academy of Fine Arts, Philadelphia, Penn., Pepsi Cola Portrait of America Exhibit, Society of Independent Artists, and Salons of America. She appeared in solo exhibitions at the Museum of Modern Art, Newark Museum, University of Nebraska, and Zabriskie Gallery.

Collections

Schmidt's work has been widely collected American museums, including the American Academy of Arts and Letters, Metropolitan Museum of Art, Museum of Modern Art, Newark Museum (Newark, N.J.), Santa Barbara Museum (Santa Barbara, Cal.), Sata Roby Foundation Collection, Smithsonian American Art Museum (Washington, D.C.), University of Arizona, Weatherspoon Art Museum (University of North Carolina at Greensboro), and Whitney Museum of American Art. Unless otherwise indicated, these museums are in New York.

Art activism

During the early years of her career Schmidt joined the Society of Independent Artists and the Salons of America as well as the Whitney Studio Club and these connections suggest a liberal, or as it was then termed, radical attitude toward art and artists. Wishing to further the careers of young American artists, these organizations aimed to counter the conservative practices of the National Academy of Arts and Sciences by holding exhibitions free of juries and prizes and offering works for sale without commission. They engaged the New York public with advertising and with publicity campaigns having slogans such as "what is home without a modern picture?" In joining them Schmidt placed herself among the progressive and independent artists of the time.

In 1923, the same year in which she was given a solo show at the Whitney Studio Club, Schmidt's work appeared in the New Gallery on Madison Avenue. The gallery was then in its inaugural year, she was one of the few women included in its roster, and a painting of hers achieved what was probably her first commercial sale. It may be more significant, however, that the New Gallery had published a strongly-worded manifesto which aligned it with the club as a liberal force in the New York art world. The statement said the gallery was "an experiment to ascertain whether there is a public ready to take an interest in contemporary pictures which are something more than slick and servile patterns of the past" and it envisioned the formation of a society of artists who agreed with its goals. To accomplish this vision the gallery formed a club made up of artists and gallery patrons of which Schmidt became a member.

In the early 1930s Schmidt participated in another organization devoted to the support of art in contemporary American culture, and on behalf of that organization she led an effort to convince museums that they should compensate artists through rental fees when they exhibited works without purchasing them. The organization was the American Society of Painters, Sculptors, and Gravers and her position was chair of the Committee on Rentals. Despite repeated requests and an intense publicity campaign most museums refused to pay the requested rental fees. The controversy reached a peak when many artists refused to participate in a show at the Carnegie Museum in Pittsburgh and it dwindled out after the museums and several influential art critics refused to budge.

In the mid-1930s Schmidt and Kuniyoshi had what proved to be an amicable divorce and, believing herself happily independent, she was surprised to find herself in love. Her second husband was Irvine J. Shubert who would become a lifelong companion. Because Shubert made a good living as a lawyer, she did not experience the financial straits which afflicted many other artists in those times. All the same she became a strong supporter of government support of the arts and when it was announced that the Federal Art Project would be shut down she joined Alfred Barr and others in giving testimony before a congressional committee to urge its continuance. After its demise she helped draw up a plan by which New York State would purchase works by artists for use in public buildings and for exhibitions that would circulate to public buildings and community centers. Although the effort did not succeed, it helped inspire the state's Council on Arts some years later. Of her involvement in arts activism Schmidt later said, "I enjoyed very much doing that kind of thing. I had been freed from a lot of responsibilities and I had the time to do it."

Personal life

Schmidt was born on February 6, 1899, in Xenia, Ohio. Both her parents had been born in Germany having emigrated to the United States following the turmoil of the German revolutions of 1848–49. They named her after a maternal aunt whose amateur painting would help Schmidt find her own love of art. She had one sibling, Anna, who was a year younger. Before she was ten her family moved to New York City. There she attended local public schools and was still a high school student when she started attending Saturday afternoon classes at the Art Students League.

Schmidt met Yasuo Kuniyoshi in 1917 while studying at the League. When they married two years later Schmidt's parents cut her off from the family and formally disowned her, causing her to lose American citizenship. Because Kuniyoshi had little income and Schmidt none, they were fortunate to have been supported by Hamilton Easter Field's gift of places to stay during the winter at a house he owned in Brooklyn and during the summer in a small studio he had built in Ogunquit. While the summer place proved to be temporary, the apartment in Brooklyn was theirs to use, free of payment, from the time they married until their divorce in 1932. Despite careful budgeting of limited finances, they both had to take jobs, Schmidt as director of a sketch class at Whitney and as informal assistant to Juliana Force and Kuniyoshi as frame-maker and art photographer. They were able to earn enough to support a ten-month trip to Europe over 1926 and 1926, a return trip in 1928, and the purchase of a house in Woodstock, N.Y., in 1932.

They returned to France in May 1928 but Schmidt came back to New York early saying the French influence did not suit her and that she was most comfortable with what she called "American corn." After they had begun spending their summers in the Woodstock house she found that managing it and  providing hospitality to the many guests they were expected to entertain kept her from making art.

When Kuniyoshi and Schmidt divorced in 1932 she stopped spending her summers in Woodstock. Although she was upset about Kuniyoshi's failure to treat her as an equal, the divorce was not acrimonious and the two remained friends. She was at his bedside when he died in 1953 and subsequently remained on good terms with his wife Sara. Soon after the divorce she was befriended by a young lawyer with artistic inclinations and the following year they married. They lived in Greenwich Village for some years, but after he became a vice president for a large hotel chain, they moved to a hotel apartment. She welcomed the change because it was time-consuming and frustrating for her to maintain an old townhouse during wartime labor shortages and apartment living gave her more time to paint and draw.

Her new husband, Irvine J. Shubert, had been born in Austria in 1902. His family emigrated to New York in 1910 and he became a lawyer on graduating from Columbia University Law School in 1925.

Schmidt was diagnosed with lung cancer in 1964. Two operations and a long recovery period reduced the time she could devote to painting and drawing. She nonetheless remained at work and survived until 1978 when she died of a recurrence of cancer.

Other names

Schmidt used Katherine Schmidt as her professional name throughout her career. An exception appeared in 1921 when she showed in the fifth annual exhibition of the Society of Independent Artists as "K. Kuniyoshi." In transacting business and performing community service functions she was sometimes known by either of her married names, Kuniyoshi or Shubert.

Notes

References

External links

Finding Aid to the Katherine Schmidt Papers at Archives of American Art

Artists from Ohio
20th-century American painters
Modern painters
1899 births
1978 deaths
People from Xenia, Ohio
Art Students League of New York alumni
20th-century American women artists
Society of Independent Artists
American women painters